Pierre Langlois (born 2 February 1958) is a French sprint canoeist who competed in the early 1980s. At the 1980 Summer Olympics in Moscow, he finished ninth in the C-2 500 m event while withdrawing prior to the heats of the C-1 1000 m event.

References
Sports-Reference.com profile

1958 births
Canoeists at the 1980 Summer Olympics
French male canoeists
Living people
Olympic canoeists of France
20th-century French people